Magazin is a Croatian pop band from Split. Founded in 1979 under the name Dalmatinski magazin ("Dalmatian Magazine" in Croatian), the band quickly began to make a mark on local pop music festivals with its songs influenced by Dalmatian folk music. The band currently consists of lead vocalist Andrea Šušnjara, guitarist Željko Baričić and bass guitarist Nenad Vesanović Keko. Baričić is the only active founding member even though Vesanović featured on every album to date.

History
The band is a successor to Mladi Batali band that was founded in 1966. The original name Dalmatinski Magazin was shortened to Magazin in 1982. after singer Majda Šoletić left the band.
Their gradual rise in popularity continued in the 1980s with a series of prestigious festival victories. But their peak of popularity was reached while Ljiljana Nikolovska was the band's lead singer. The leader and songwriter Tonči Huljić began to insert elements of folk music of other European countries in his songs. Magazin became one of the most popular and most influential music bands in Croatia. Magazin have sold more than 15 million albums worldwide, which is the most for a Yugoslavian musical act. Their biggest hits are "Put putujem" (I'm travelling), "Ti si želja mog života" (You are the desire of my life), "Oko moje sanjivo" (My sleepy eye), "Sve bi me curice ljubile" (All girls would kiss me), "Balkanska ulica" (Balkan street), "Istambul", "Zna srce, zna" (The heart knows, knows), "Sve bi seke ljubile mornare" (All girls would like to kiss sailors), "Boli me" (It hurts), "Besane noći" (Sleepless nights) and many more. Most of these songs are considered as classics in Croatia.
The band won the first iteration of Dora in 1992. with the song "Aleluja" but Croatia was not eligible to compete in the Eurovision Song Contest. Later, they entered the 1995 Eurovision Song Contest with "Nostalgija".

Members

Current members
Željko Baričić – guitar (1979-present)
Nenad Vesanović – Keko – bass guitar (1979-present)
Andrea Šušnjara – lead vocals (2010-present)

Former members
Igor Biočić – bass guitar (1979)
Zoran Marinković – drums (1979-1984)
Miro Crnko – keyboards (1979-1992)
Tonči Huljić – keyboards (1979-2006)
Ante Miletić – drums (1984-2013)
Ivan Huljić – keyboards (2006-2014)

Former vocals
Majda Šoletić – lead vocals (1979-1982)
Marija Kuzmić – lead vocals (1982-1983)
Ljiljana Nikolovska – lead vocals (1983-1990)
Danijela Martinović – lead vocals (1991-1996)
Jelena Rozga – lead vocals (1996-2006)
Ivana Kovač – lead vocals (2006-2010)

Discography
Slatko stanje (1982) ("The Sweet State") singer Marija Kuzmić, 200000 copies sold / first year
Kokolo (1983) singer Ljiljana Nikolovska, 270000 copies sold / first year
O, la, la (1984) singer Ljiljana Nikolovska, 12000 copies sold / first year
Piši mi (1985) ("Write to Me") singer Ljiljana Nikolovska, 380000 copies sold / first year
Put putujem (1986) ("I am Traveling") singer Ljiljana Nikolovska, 670000 copies sold / first year
Magazin (1987) singer Ljiljana Nikolovska, 630000 copies sold / first year
Besane noći (1988) ("Sleepless Nights") singer Ljiljana Nikolovska, 460000 copies sold / first year
Dobro jutro (1989) ("Good Morning") singer Ljiljana Nikolovska, 380000 copies sold / first year
Da mi te zaljubit u mene (1991) ("If I Could Make You Fall In Love With Me") singer Danijela Martinovic, 50000 copies sold / first year
Došlo vrijeme (1993) ("The Time Has Come") singer Danijela Martinović, 40000 copies sold
Najbolje godine (1993) ("The Best Years") singer Ljiljana Nikolovska, 430000 copies sold
Simpatija (1994) ("Sympathy") singer Danijela Martinović, 41000 copies sold
Nebo boje moje ljubavi (1996) ("The sky in the color of my Love") singer Jelena Rozga
Da si ti ja (1998) ("If you were Me") singer Jelena Rozga, 120000 copies sold / first year
Minus i plus (2000) ("Minus and Plus") singer Jelena Rozga, 42000 copies sold / first year
S druge strane mjeseca (2002) ("From the other side of the Moon") singer Jelena Rozga, 22000 copies sold / first year
Paaa..? (2004) ("Well...") singer Jelena Rozga, 28000 copies sold / first year
Dama i car (2007) ("Lady and Emperor") singer Ivana Kovač, 8500 copies sold / first year
Bossa n' Magazin (2008) singer Ivana Kovač, 5000 copies sold / first year

References

External links
Grupa Magazin – Official Fan Club on FaceBook
Grupa Magazin Official YouTube

Yugoslav musical groups
Eurovision Song Contest entrants for Croatia
Eurovision Song Contest entrants of 1995
Croatian pop music groups
Musicians from Split, Croatia